No Limits (泳闯琴关) is a Singaporean Chinese-language drama series broadcast in 2010 to celebrate the inaugural Summer Youth Olympics. It stars Felicia Chin, Dai Xiangyu, Elvin Ng & Tracy Lee as the main casts of the series. It was aired on weekdays in the 9pm time slot. This series repeated at 12pm on Sundays in 2020.

Synopsis
As her name suggests, You Yongxin is an avid swimmer whose ambition is to make the national team like her father You Shan, the famed "Flying Fish". Her new competitor is the naturally athletic Chen Fei, who has recently returned from abroad. To her shock, Fei is actually her half sister from the same mother. Unfortunately, she becomes involved in a love triangle between herself, Fei, her father's old friend's son Yaoyang and her neighbour Yule. She returns to the pool to forget her sorrows and trains even harder.

Cast
Felicia Chin as You Yongxin 游泳欣
Dai Xiangyu as Wang Yule 王宇乐
Elvin Ng as Ou Yaoyang 欧耀阳
Tracy Lee as Chen Fei 陈菲
Yuan Shuai as Yang Leiming "Thunder" 杨雷鸣
Lin Meijiao as Wang Ruoyun 王若云
Pan Lingling as Yvonne Fu Liling 傅丽玲
Chen Tianwen as Ou Yingxiong 欧英雄
Rebecca Lim as Xu Jiayi 许嘉宜
Wang Yuqing as You Shan 游山
Li Wenhai as Chen Jianshun 陈健顺
Teo Ser Li as Bai Nana 白娜娜
Julie Tan as Liu Xinyu 刘欣雨

See also
List of programmes broadcast by Mediacorp Channel 8

References

External links
Official Website
No Limits on MediaCorp's corporate website

Singapore Chinese dramas
2010 Singaporean television series debuts
2010 Singaporean television series endings
Channel 8 (Singapore) original programming